The archdeacon of Gower is the priest in charge of the archdeaconry of Gower, an administrative division of the Church in Wales Diocese of Swansea and Brecon. The archdeaconry comprises the six deaneries of Clyne, Cwmtawe, Gower, Llwchwr, Penderi and Swansea.

History
The archdeaconry of Gower and the corresponding role of archdeacon of Gower were created in 1923, coinciding with the creation of the Diocese of Swansea and Brecon. The other archdeaconry of the current diocese, Brecon archdeaconry has existed since 1137 or before.

List of archdeacons
1923–1954 (d.): Harold Williams
1954–1958 (res.): Jack Thomas (became Bishop of Swansea and Brecon)
February 1958 – 1959: John Thomas
August 1959 – 1969: David Thomas
1969–1979 (ret.): Harry Craven Williams MBE
1979-1983 Hubert Hughes
1983–1987 (ret.): Harold Williams
1987–1989 (ret.): Owain Jones
1990–1995 (ret.): Roy Luther Thomas
1995–1999 (res.): Anthony Pierce (became Bishop of Swansea and Brecon)
1999–2000 (ret.): Brian James
2000–2016 (ret.): Robert Williams
25 September 2016present: Jonathan Davies

References

Gower